Uzair (Arabic: عزير), also spelled "Uzayr" or "Ozair", is a male name. It is the Arabic equivalent of the Hebrew name "Ezra", and it means "helper" or "strength". The name originated from the Islamic prophet "Uzair", who is often identified as the biblical prophet "Ezra". It's sometimes used as a surname, but mostly as a given name.

Popularity 
 3,010th most popular boy name (2020)
 2,515th most popular boy name (2019) 
 3,816th most popular boy name (2018)
 4,367th most popular boy name (2017)
 5,880th most popular boy name (2016)
 3,699th most popular boy name (2015)
 4,449th most popular boy name (2014)
 5,266th most popular boy name (2013)
 3,401st most popular boy name (2012)
 4,574th most popular boy name (2011)
 4,591st most popular boy name (2010)

People

Given name 
 Uzair (Islamic prophet), a prophet in Islam

 Uzair Baloch, a Pakistani gangster and former crime lord
 Uzair Cassiem, a South African rugby union player
 Uzair Gul Peshawari, an Islamic scholar and Indian freedom struggle activist
 Uzair Jaswal, a Pakistani singer and actor
 Uzair Khan, a Pakistani politician
 Uzair Mahomed, a South African English cricketer
 Uzair Paracha, a Pakistani citizen who was arrested and later freed
 Uzair-ul-Haq, a Pakistani first-class cricketer
 Uzair Zaheer Khan, a Pakistani film director, screenwriter and computer graphics artist.

Last name 
 Abu Uzair, a Muslim teacher and Islamist activist
 Ali Uzair, a Pakistani footballer
 Mohammad Uzair, a Pakistani economist, senior bureaucrat and professor emeritus

See also 
 Azariah
 Ezra
 Umair
 Uzer (disambiguation)
 Uzziah
 Zuhayr (disambiguation)

References 

Arabic masculine given names
Surnames
Arabic-language surnames
Surnames of Arabic origin